Laurent Wuillot (born 11 July 1975 in Belgium) is a Belgian retired footballer who now works as manager of RAFC Cuesmes in his home country.

Career

Wuillot started his senior career with R.A.E.C. Mons. In 2002, he signed for AC Ajaccio in the French Ligue 1, where he made eight appearances and scored zero goals. After that, he played for R.W.D.M. Brussels, R.R.C. Peruwelz, and Francs Borains.

References

External links 
 LAURENT WUILLOT
 In Ajaccio, Wuillot has a good life Le Montois will come back next Saturday
 Brussels - Return to Belgium The resurrection of Laurent Wuillot
 Ex-Carolo Laurent Wuillot completely changed his life: "It was complicated to stop everything"
 Laurent Wuillot: "Show humility"

Living people
1975 births
Belgian footballers
Association football defenders
R.A.E.C. Mons players
R. Charleroi S.C. players
Standard Liège players
AC Ajaccio players
R.W.D.M. Brussels F.C. players
S.V. Zulte Waregem players
Royal Excel Mouscron players
Belgian expatriate footballers
Expatriate footballers in France
Francs Borains players